This list contains famous or notable people who were either born, residents, or otherwise closely associated with the City of Edinburgh, Scotland. The entries in each section are listed alphabetically.

Architecture

Arts

Authors

Medicine, science and engineering

Military

Religion

Royalty

Charles X of France (1757–1836), in Holyrood Palace during his exile
Henry Stuart, Lord Darnley (1545–1567), King consort of Scotland
Madeleine of Valois (1520–1537), first spouse of King James V of Scotland
Saint Margaret of Scotland (c. 1045–1093), wife of Malcolm Canmore
Mary of Guise (1515–1560), regent of Scotland, and mother of Mary, Queen of Scots
Mary, Queen of Scots (1542–1587), lived in Holyrood Palace
Mynyddog Mwynfawr, Brittonic ruler of kingdom of Gododdin in Hen Ogledd (in reading of Y Gododdin accepted by most scholars), perhaps with his court at Din Eidyn

Scottish Enlightenment

Sports

Miscellaneous

See also
List of Scots

References

 
Edinburgh
 
Edinburgh
Edinburgh-related lists